This is a list of the French Singles & Airplay Chart Reviews number-ones of 1980.

Summary

Singles chart

See also
1980 in music
List of number-one hits (France)

References

1980 in French music
1980 record charts
Lists of number-one songs in France